Hegelsom (Limburgish: Haegelsem) is a village in the Dutch province of Limburg. It is located in the municipality of Horst aan de Maas.

The village was first mentioned in 1424 as Heugelsem, and means "settlement of Hegel (person)". Hegelsom developed in the 19th century as a heath excavation village. Hegelsom was home to 280 people in 1840.

Notable people 
 Raymond Knops (b. 1971), politician

Gallery

References 

Populated places in Limburg (Netherlands)
Horst aan de Maas